Method Animation (sometimes called Method Animation Studios or Norman Studios  and also known as ON Animation Studios or ON Kids & Family or Mediawan Animation) is a  French company which produces CGI-animated shows. It came together in 2014 as the culmination of a merger of Dimitri Rassam's Chapter 2 and Alexis Vonarb's Onyx Films. Method Animation is the parent company of media conglomerate Mediawan. Paris-based ON Entertainment, headed by Rassam, is one of its divisions. In 2018, Mediawan (which was founded by Xavier Niel, Matthieu Pigasse and Pierre-Antoine Capton in 2015) hold 53.53% stake in Method Animation through its acquisition of ON Kids & Family and ON Entertainment, thus bringing it under the same ownership with Storia Television which was derived from the former French television division of Luc Besson's EuropaCorp.

Key people

Aton Soumache
Aton Soumache is a producer of animated films. He is the CEO of Method Animation. Soumache is perhaps best known for The Little Prince, for which he, Rassam, Alexis Vonarb, and Mark Osborne won the 2016 César Award for Best Animated Film.

Dimitri Rassam
See article Dimitri Rassam

Caroline Guillot
She is the marketing manager of Method Animation.

Alexis Vonarb
He was born in 1970, and is an alumnus of Robert Schuman University, Strasbourg. Then he studied at the University of Leicester in the UK. While working in production at La Fémis in 1995, he got to know Soumache. He founded Onyx Films, which went on to produce 15 films, including Renaissance (2006) which won an award at the Annecy International Animated Film Festival.

TV series
 Super 4
 Cosmic Quantum Ray
 Flatmania
 Freefonix
 Robin Hood: Mischief in Sherwood
Skyland
The Pinky and Perky Show
The Gnoufs

Co-produced with DQ Entertainment
Via producer Tapaas Chakravarti:
 Chaplin & Co
 The Little Prince
 The New Adventures of Peter Pan
 Robin Hood: Mischief in Sherwood (seasons 1-2)
 Le Petit Nicolas
 Iron Man: Armored Adventures

Co-produced with Zagtoon
Via producer Jeremy Zag:
 Miraculous: Tales of Ladybug and Cat Noir (also with Toei Animation, SAMG Animation and De Agostini Editore)
Popples (also with American Greetings, Nexus Factory and Umedia) for Gulli and Netflix
Zak Storm (also with Man of Action, SAMG Animation, MNC Animation and De Agostini Editore)
Power Players (also with Man of Action, Planeta Group, WDR Mediagroup and Kaibou)

Films
Renaissance (as Norman Studios) 2006
The Prodigies (as Norman Studios) 2011
Mune: Guardian of the Moon (as ON Animation Studios) 2014
The Little Prince (as ON Animation Studios) 2015
Tall Tales from the Magical Garden of Antoon Krings (as ON Entertainment) 2017
Playmobil: The Movie (as ON Animation Studios) 2019
Little Vampire (as ON Entertainment) 2020
Le Petit Nicolas - Qu'est-ce qu'on attend pour être heureux ? (as ON Entertainment) 2022
The Magnificent Life of Marcel Pagnol (as ON Entertainment) 2024
The Badalisc (as ON Entertainment)
Little Jules Verne (as ON Entertainment)

References

External links
http://www.methodanimation.fr 
ON Animation Studios
ON Entertainment Studios

French companies established in 2008
Mass media companies established in 2008
Stereoscopy
French animation studios
Television production companies of France
Companies based in Paris
Method Animation